Mater Group was formed in 2016 by aligning Mater Health, Mater Education, Mater Research and Mater Foundation under a single, unified banner. Mater provides care for some 500,000 patients each year. Mater was established in 1906 by the Sisters of Mercy.  In 2002, Mater became an incorporated body, charged with the responsibility to continue the Mission of the Sisters of Mercy to "offer compassionate service to the sick and needy".

History 

In 1906, the Sisters of Mercy opened the first Mater Hospital in a private house, "Aubigny", at North Quay.  The house was converted into a 20-bed private hospital. In 1911, the funds generated by the first Mater Private Hospital, and its successor at South Brisbane, allowed the Sisters of Mercy to open a free public hospital for the city of Brisbane.

In 1919, Queensland's first hospital laboratory was established at the Mater.

In 1928, the Mater Public Hospital installed Queensland's first deep X-ray therapy machine to treat cancer patients.

In 1931, Mater opened the 80 bed Mater Children's Hospital, the first Children's Hospital south of the Brisbane river,  treating over 8,266 patients in its first year of operation.

In 1953, eastern Australia's first ‘Eye bank’ opened at the Mater.

In 1954, Mater established Queensland's first Neurological Department.

In 1960, the Mater Mothers' Hospital was officially opened, accommodating for 140 mothers.

In 1967 blood transfusions were performed on a baby in utero for the first time in Queensland.

In 1987 Mater Children's Hospital established Queensland's first paediatric sleep unit.

In 1988 the Brisbane Mater Health Service was the official health provider for Brisbane's Expo 88.

In 1989 the Mater Private Priority Emergency Centre was opened – the first in any Queensland hospital.

In 1998, the Mater Children's Private Hospital opens becoming Australia's first private paediatric facility.

On 14 April 1999, the Mater Private Hospital in Gladstone officially opened.

In 2000, Mater Private Hospital – Redland is officially opened.

In 2006, Mater Health Services becomes the first institution to win a Queensland Greats award.

In 2008, the new Mater Mothers' Hospitals opened on the South Brisbane campus.

In 2010, Mater Private Hospital Brisbane has become the first private hospital in Queensland to launch an automatic notification system for tissue donation.

In 2014, Mater Children's Hospital closed after 83 years service, replaced by the new Lady Cilento Children's Hospital. Mater Children's Private Brisbane is still operational.
In mid-2014, Mater Health Services joined with 7 other organisations to form the Brisbane Diamantina Health Partners, with the aim to work collaboratively to improve health outcomes through the integration of research, education and clinical delivery.

In mid-2015, Mater Centre for Neurosciences opened

In October 2015, Mater Private Hospital Springfield opened

In July 2015, a truck collided with the overhead footbridge attached to the Mater Hospital in Brisbane which crosses Raymond Terrace, causing damages costing $170,000. Mater Group attempted to sue the truck driver and his employer but the claim was dismissed with a subsequent appeal also dismissed.

In 2015, the 18-bed Mater Hospital in Yeppoon was closed due to not being financially viable, with the opening of the new Capricorn Coast Hospital, the close proximity of the Rockhampton Hospital and low patient numbers named as contributing factors.

In 2020, the 33-bed Mater Private Hospital in Gladstone was closed due to no longer being viable. It had operated for 21 years, closing departments from 2018 until final closure in 2020. After it was listed for sale in 2019, it was purchased by Queensland Health in 2020 and incorporated into the existing public health facilities.

Private hospitals 

Mater Children's Private Brisbane
Mater Mothers' Private Brisbane
Mater Private Hospital Brisbane
Mater Private Hospital Bundaberg
Mater Private Hospital Redland
Mater Private Hospital Rockhampton
Mater Private Hospital Springfield
Mater Private Hospital Mackay
Mater Private Hospital Townsville

Public hospitals 

Mater Hospital Brisbane (formerly Mater Adult Hospital)
Mater Children's Hospital (closed 29 November 2014)
Mater Mothers' Hospital

Recently, mater public hospitals has seen some publicity for applying catholic code of conduct to public patients in a public hospital. in particular around the use of reproductive heath technologies.

See also
Mater Health Services North Queensland
List of hospitals in Australia

References

Further reading

External links

Mater Health Services Motion Pictures 1948-1980, State Library of Queensland

Hospitals in Brisbane
Teaching hospitals in Australia
Catholic Church in Australia
Hospitals established in 1906
1906 establishments in Australia
South Brisbane, Queensland
Queensland Greats